Old Crow Medicine Show is an Americana string band based in Nashville, Tennessee, that has been recording since 1998. They were inducted into the Grand Ole Opry on September 17, 2013. Their ninth album, Remedy, released in 2014, won the Grammy Award for Best Folk Album. The group's music has been called old-time, folk, and alternative country. Along with original songs, the band performs many pre-World War II blues and folk songs.

Bluegrass musician Doc Watson discovered the band while its members were busking outside a pharmacy in Boone, North Carolina, in 2000. With an old-time string sound fueled by punk rock energy, it has influenced acts like Mumford & Sons and contributed to a revival of banjo-picking string bands playing Americana music — leading to variations on it.

The group released their sixth studio album, Volunteer, through Columbia Nashville on April 20, 2018 — coinciding with their 20th anniversary as a group. They released 50 Years of Blonde on Blonde on April 28, 2017 (their first album on Columbia Nashville). Previous studio albums were Eutaw (2002) O.C.M.S. (2004), Big Iron World (2006), Tennessee Pusher (2008), Carry Me Back (2012), and Remedy (2014) and Volunteer (2017). Their song "Wagon Wheel", a more or less traditional song written by frontman Ketch Secor through a co-authoring arrangement with Bob Dylan, was certified platinum by the Recording Industry Association of America in April 2013 and has been covered by a number of acts, including Darius Rucker, who made the song a top 40 hit.

The band was featured along with Edward Sharpe and the Magnetic Zeros and Mumford & Sons in the music documentary Big Easy Express, which won a Grammy Award for Best Long Form Music Video in 2013. They performed on the Railroad Revival Tour across the U.S. in 2011. They appeared at the Stagecoach Festival 2013 and multiple times at other major festivals, e.g., Bonnaroo Music Festival, MerleFest, Telluride Bluegrass Festival, Hardly Strictly Bluegrass Festival, and Newport Folk Festival.

They have made frequent guest appearances on A Prairie Home Companion with Garrison Keillor. The group received the 2013 Trailblazer Award from the Americana Music Association, performing at the Americana Honors & Awards Show.

History

Early

Ketch Secor and Chris "Critter" Fuqua met in the seventh grade in Harrisonburg, Virginia and began playing music together. They performed open mics at the Little Grill diner, as did Robert St. Ours who went on to found The Hackensaw Boys. Secor had been "driving up to Mt. Jackson, VA to the bluegrass Saturday night in the summer, going up to Davis and Elkins College to participate in the Old-Time Music week there, and meeting guys like Richie Stearns."  Secor formed the Route 11 Boys with St. Ours and his brothers, often performing at Little Grill.

Willie Watson first met Ben Gould in high school in Watkins Glen, New York. After playing music together, both dropped out of school and formed the band The Funnest Game. Their brand of electric/old-time was heavily influenced by the old-time music scene prominent in Tompkins and Schuyler County, New York, including The Horse Flies and The Highwoods Stringband.

After the breakup of the Route 11 Boys, Secor attended Ithaca College. He brought Fuqua up to New York State, where they met Watson. Watson dissolved The Funnest Game and together they assembled players all around Ithaca, New York "where there is a very lively old-time music scene." This included Kevin Hayes. They recorded an album that they could sell on the road — a cassette of ten songs called Trans:mission.

The group embarked on their Trans: mission tour in October 1998, busking across Canada. Circling back east in Spring 1999, they moved into a farmhouse on Beech Mountain, near Boone, North Carolina, where they were embraced by the Appalachian community. Their repertoire of old-time songs grew as they played with local musicians."

"Wagon Wheel"

Fuqua first brought home a Bob Dylan bootleg from a family trip to London containing a rough outtake called "Rock Me, Mama", passing it to Secor. Not "so much a song as a sketch," Secor would later say, "crudely recorded featuring most prominently a stomping boot, the candy-coated chorus and a mumbled verse that was hard to make out". But the tune kept going through his mind. A few months later, while attending Phillips Exeter Academy in New Hampshire, and "feeling homesick for the South," he added verses about "hitchhiking his way home full of romantic notions put in his head by the Beat poets and, most of all, Dylan."

Secor says he sang his amplification of the song "all around the country from about 17 to 26, before I ever even thought, 'oh I better look into this.'" When he sought copyright in 2003, to release the song on O.C.M.S. in (2004), he discovered Dylan credited the phrase "Rock me, mama" to bluesman Arthur "Big Boy" Crudup (who likely got it from a Big Bill Broonzy recording) "In a way, it's taken something like 85 years to get completed," Secor says. Secor and Dylan signed a co-writing agreement, and share copyright on the song, agreeing to a "50–50 split in authorship."

Officially released twice, on an early EP and their second album ("O.C.M.S." in 2004), the song would become the group's signature song — going gold in 2011 and platinum in 2013.

Busking break

One day the group were busking outside a pharmacy called Boone Drug — "playing on Doc's old corner" where he'd "started playing in the 1950s" on King Street in Boone, North Carolina — when the daughter of folk-country legend Doc Watson (died May 29, 2012) heard them. Certain her father would be impressed, she led the blind musician over for a listen. The group "struck up 'Oh My Little Darling', a well-known old-time song they thought Doc would like." When they finished, he said: "Boys, that was some of the most authentic old-time music I've heard in a long while. You almost got me crying." Doc invited the band to participate in his annual MerleFest music festival in Wilkesboro, North Carolina (for 2000).

"That gig changed our lives and we look to it as a pivotal turning point as Old Crow Medicine Show," says Secor. He and Fuqua wrote a song "About being on the corner in Boone and [Watson] discovering us. It honors Doc and the high country blues sound."

Grand Ole Opry
The big busking break led to the act's relocation to Nashville in October 2000. At MerleFest, Secor explains, Sally Williams "from the Grand Ole Opry . . invited us to participate in some summer music events at the Grand Ole Opry House doing our street act, our busking, and that's why we came to Nashville . ." Williams first booked them for "an Opryland Plaza outdoor show." In Nashville they were "embraced and mentored" by Marty Stuart, the president of the Grand Ole Opry, who first spied the group at the Nashville-area Uncle Dave Macon Days festival and added them to his "Electric Barnyard old-fashioned country variety package show bus tour" with acts like Merle Haggard, Connie Smith, and BR5-49. Soon they were opening for "everyone from Loretta Lynn and Dolly Parton to Ricky Skaggs and Del McCoury . ."

The group made their Grand Ole Opry debut at the Ryman Auditorium, "The Mother Church of Country Music", in January 2001.  Given just four minutes on stage, they played "Tear It Down"—a "singing jug-band romp about punishing infidelity"—and received a "rare first-time-out standing ovation, and a call for an encore." In August 2013, Stuart unexpectedly appeared onstage at the Ohio Theatre in Cleveland, where the group was performing, to invite them to become official members of the Opry. They were formally inducted at a special ceremony at the Grand Ole Opry House in Nashville, September 17, 2013.

In 2020, the band released three tracks that all speak to the current state of the world: "Nashville Rising," written after Nashville's Super Tuesday tornadoes and directly benefiting relief efforts; "Quarantined," a tongue-in-cheek, classic country-inspired number about not being able to kiss your lover while quarantined; and "Pray For America," which was commissioned by NPR as an inspirational piece for listeners coming out of COVID. They also appeared on a duet with Keb' Mo' titled "The Medicine Man" as well as teamed up with filmmaker Julia Golonka to create a video for the 2008 track "Motel In Memphis" raising funds for Nashville's community-based grassroots organization Gideon's Army.

Later that year, Old Crow Medicine Show purchased a building in Nashville that has since been dubbed the band's "Hartland Studio," where they have been hard at work recording new music and producing their "Hartland Hootenanny" live stream variety shows.

Albums

Carry Me Back (2012)
Carry Me Back was released July 17, 2012 on ATO Records. Recorded at Sound Emporium Studios in Nashville, produced by Ted Hutt, the name derives from "Carry Me Back to Old Virginny", former official state song of Virginia.

"Levi" is "about a soldier who grew up in the wild hillbilly woods of Virginia," First Lieutenant Leevi Barnard from Ararat, Virginia who was "killed by a suicide bomber" in Baghdad's Dora Market in 2009. In the NPR broadcast where Secor heard the story, the late lieutenant's friends "broke into Barnard's favorite song" . . "Wagon Wheel" at his funeral.

The album sold over 17,000 copies its debut week, "landing at #22 on the Billboard Albums Chart", leading to both the band's best-ever sales week and their highest ever charting position. It attained #1 on both the Bluegrass and Folk charts and was the #4 Country album in the nation".

Remedy (2014)
The group's ninth album, Remedy, was released in July 2014 by ATO Records and produced by Ted Hutt—who produced their previous studio record. The album features a collaboration with Bob Dylan, "Sweet Amarillo", and ballads "Dearly Departed Friend" and "Firewater", the latter written by Fuqua. Remedy won the Grammy Award for Best Folk Album in 2015. This award—created in 2012 to address "challenges in distinguishing between" previous category Best Contemporary Folk Album and Best Traditional Folk Album musical genres—was won by Guy Clark the previous year and Béla Fleck & Abigail Washburn the next. Also nominated in 2015 were Mike Auldridge, Jerry Douglas & Rob Ickes for Three Bells, Alice Gerrard for Follow the Music, Eliza Gilkyson for The Nocturne Diaries, and Jesse Winchester (1944–2014) for A Reasonable Amount of Trouble.

50 Years of Blonde on Blonde (2017)
The group released 50 Years of Blonde on Blonde on April 28, 2017 on their new label Columbia Nashville. The album pays tribute to Dylan's 1966 masterpiece Blonde on Blonde with live recordings of the group's re-creation of it at the Country Music Hall of Fame and Museum in Nashville in May 2016.

The project doubles as the group's first release for the Columbia label, which also released Blonde on Blonde. They announced their addition to the roster with an impromptu performance of "Rainy Day Women #12 & 35" from the Dylan album. In support of the album release, Secor states:

Fifty years is a long time for a place like Nashville, Tennessee. Time rolls on slowly around here like flotsam and jetsam in the muddy Cumberland River. But certain things have accelerated the pace of our city. And certain people have sent the hands of the clock spinning. Bob Dylan is the greatest of these time-bending, paradigm-shifting Nashville cats.

Volunteer (2018) 
Old Crow Medicine Show released their sixth studio album, Volunteer, through Columbia Nashville on April 20, 2018 — coinciding with their 20th anniversary as a group. The album was recorded at Nashville's "historic" RCA Studio A with Americana "super-producer" Dave Cobb, known for his work with Jason Isbell and Chris Stapleton. The album features electric guitar for the first time since 2004 — when David Rawlings added his Telecaster to "Wagon Wheel". Joe Jackson Andrews plays pedal steel guitar. As quoted in Billboard, Secor says of the album's sound:

"Look Away" is a "Rolling Stones-inspired tribute to the history of the American South," while "A World Away" is an "upbeat homage to refugees." "Dixie Avenue" is a wistful tribute to the place in Virginia where Secor and Fuqua first "fell in love with music." The closing song "Whirlwind" is a "bittersweet love song that could easily describe Old Crow Medicine's rise to prominence from the ground up."

The lead single "Flicker & Shine" was released January 19, 2018.

Paint This Town (2022) 
The band released their seventh studio album, Paint This Town on April 22, 2022. It is their first to feature members Jerry Pentecost (drums/percussion), Mike Harris (banjo/guitar) and Mason Via (guitar/vocals) and their first since the second departure of founding member Fuqua at the end of 2019. In March 2023, Old Crow played at C2C: Country to Country, Europe's largest country music festival, performing at 3Arena in Dublin, OVO Hydro in Glasgow and The O2 Arena in London.

Musical style

Variously described as old-time, Americana, bluegrass, alternative country, and "folk-country", the group started out infusing old Appalachian sounds with new punk energy. Country Music Television notes their "tunes from jug bands and traveling shows, back porches and dance halls, southern Appalachian string music and Memphis blues."  Gabrielle Gray, executive director of the International Bluegrass Music Museum—who sponsors ROMP: Bluegrass Roots & Branches Festival, which Old Crow headlined one night in 2012—holds the group "is in the direction of progressive bluegrass." Their live touring show has been described as a "folk-bluegrass-alt-country blend."

"We just knew we wanted to combine the technical side of the old sound with the energy of a Nirvana," states Fuqua. Starting from old-time music in the Appalachian hills, the group found themselves "making a foray into electric instruments and 'really knocking up the rock 'n' roll tree' on their 2008 release 'Tennessee Pusher'." On the documentary "Big Easy Express" about the Railroad Revival Tour with Mumford & Sons and Edward Sharpe and the Magnetic Zeros they "practice(d) a complimentary variation of folk" bringing "a pleasingly smoky amalgam of country, bluegrass, and blues." With "Carry Me Back" (2012) they've "circled back to the original sound that so excited (Secor) and Fuqua as kids . . full of old-timey string sounds updated for the 21st century – sing-a-longs that lift the soul, ballads that rend the heart and a few moments of pure exhilaration."

Busking 
"Our performance comes out of all those years spent cutting our teeth on the street corner," claims Secor. The earliest beginnings of the group involved busking in the Northeast U.S., attracting fresh talent. Guitjo player Kevin Hayes — originally from Haverhill, Massachusetts — was in Bar Harbor, Maine raking blueberries when he encountered Secor "on the street in front of a jewelry store playing the banjo." Bassist Morgan Jahnig joined the group as a result of a "random" encounter with early Old Crow performing on the streets of Nashville in 2000. Guitarist Gill Landry first met the group in 2000 while both were street performing during Mardi Gras in New Orleans, joining full-time in 2007.

Influences

An early Secor influence was John Hartford who performed for his first grade class in Missouri, making him want "to play the banjo after that;" and the first song he ever learned to play was Tom Paxton's "Ramblin' Boy". Guns N' Roses was Fuqua's "first influence": when they released Appetite for Destruction (1987), while he was in seventh grade, he knew he wanted to be a musician. He also claims AC/DC and Nirvana as influences "and then into blues and then into more obscure fiddlers. Some Conjunto from down in San Antonio." "Take 'Em Away", written when he was 17, is "loosely based on Mance Lipscomb, a blues singer and sharecropper from Navasota County" who he says "was a big influence on me."

Naming his major influences, Secor states: "Certainly, Bob Dylan... Bob Dylan... Bob Dylan. More than anything else. More than any book or song or story or play. The work and the recorded work of Bob Dylan. It's the most profound influence on me. And then the other people that really influenced me, tend to be the same people who influenced Bob Dylan." Fuqua concurs on Dylan's influence:

The Dylan doorway led to the first recordings of the New Lost City Ramblers, the Jim Kweskin Jug Band, Canned Heat, The Lovin' Spoonful, Dylan and The Band in the basement, and the Grateful Dead.

Impact

When Secor, Fuqua, and company first got together "old-timey pickers their age were few and far between. Modern rock was still a force to be reckoned with. Now hard-driving string bands are where it's at." To Americana Music Association (AMA) President Jed Hilly, the historic path of Americana music passes through the group: "The baton is passed from Emmylou Harris to Gillian Welch and David Rawlings to Old Crow Medicine Show to the Avett Brothers." Emmylou Harris was, in fact . .

Marcus Mumford, front man of Mumford & Sons, credits the group's influence: "I first heard Old Crow's music when I was, like, 16, 17, and that really got me into, like, folk music, bluegrass. I mean, I'd listened to a lot of Dylan, but I hadn't really ventured into the country world so much. So Old Crow was the band that made me fall in love with country music." Mumford acknowledges in "Big Easy Express", Emmett Malloy's "moving documentary" about the vintage train tour they'd invited Old Crow to join them on, that "the band inspired them to pick up the banjo and start their now famous country nights in London."

Old Crow received the 2013 Trailblazer Award from the Americana Music Association.

Songwriting

Early on the group didn't perform songs they'd written, instead drawing on a storehouse of pre-war jug band, string band, minstrel show, blues, and folk fare. As with other young groups in the genre, driven by all that punk music energy, they played this old material "fast and hard". When they started writing original material they distinguished themselves "from the crowded field of New Wave string bands as genuine stars. And both groups have done it by writing new songs more ambitious than mere rewrites of old hillbilly and blues numbers." Songs they write often have a socially conscious theme, such as  "I Hear Them All", "Ways Of Man", "Ain't It Enough", and "Levi".

Secor admits to developing "the habit of writing what he calls 'stolen melody songs'"—in much the same way he'd created "Wagon Wheel", carrying on in the folk tradition—"like when he penned fresh, war tax-themed lyrics to a tune that had already passed through other wholesale re-writes during its descent from old-time Scots-Irish balladry." Dave Rawlings states: "I've always thought that a really important thing that the Old Crow Medicine Show brought to the table was new songs—some reinterpreted old ones, some really nicely written and brand new—with the old flavor, but also with that vitality."

Awards, honors, and distinctions

Old Crow Medicine Show performed on a float for the 2003 Macy's Thanksgiving Day Parade.
Their music video of "I Hear Them All" (from Big Iron World) was first-round finalist in both CMT Award categories in which it was nominated. Directed by Danny Clinch, the video was shot in the Mid-City area of New Orleans featuring local residents with inspirational stories about surviving Hurricane Katrina.
For the Americana Music Award show held November 1, 2007 at the Ryman Auditorium in Nashville they joined Uncle Earl, Sunny Sweeney, Todd Snider, The Avett Brothers, Guy Clark, Emmylou Harris, the Hacienda Brothers, Elizabeth Cook, Amy LaVere, and Ricky Skaggs with Bruce Hornsby as performers on stage.
They opened for the Dave Matthews Band in 2009 at the John Paul Jones Arena in Charlottesville, VA; the Verizon Wireless Music Center in Pelham, AL; and the Nikon at Jones Beach Theater in Wantagh, NY.
The band headlined at the Grand Ole Opry, after earlier having performed at that institution's 75th-anniversary celebration, and appeared in special New Year's Eve shows in 2009 (with special guest Chuck Mead) and 2010 at the Ryman Auditorium in Nashville.
The music documentary Big Easy Express, in which the band was featured along with Edward Sharpe and the Magnetic Zeros and Mumford and Sons, won a Grammy Award for Best Long Form Music Video in March 2013. Directed by Emmett Malloy, the video was produced by Bryan Ling, Mike Luba, and Tim Lynch under the S2BN Films label.
Their recording of "Wagon Wheel" was certified platinum by the Recording Industry Association of America in April 2013.
Old Crow Medicine Show was formally inducted into the Grand Ole Opry at a special ceremony at the Grand Ole Opry House in Nashville on September 17, 2013. They join other group Opry members like Gatlin Brothers, Oak Ridge Boys, Osborne Brothers, and Rascal Flatts—and individual member acts Roy Clark, Clint Black, Garth Brooks, Charlie Daniels, Vince Gill, Emmylou Harris, Tom T. Hall, Alison Krauss, Loretta Lynn, Patti Loveless, Del McCoury, Charley Pride, and Ricky Skaggs.
The group performed during the 12th Annual Americana Honors & Awards Show, which took place September 18, 2013 at the Ryman Auditorium in Nashville, sharing stage with such acts as Stephen Stills, Richard Thompson, Emmylou Harris, and Rodney Crowell.
Darius Rucker's version of "Wagon Wheel" was nominated for CMA Single of the Year in October 2013, along with Florida Georgia Line ("Cruise"), Tim McGraw with Taylor Swift & Keith Urban ("Highway Don't Care"), Miranda Lambert ("Mama's Broken Heart"), and Kacey Musgraves ("Merry Go 'Round").
Rucker sang "Wagon Wheel" to close out the televised CMA awards ceremony November 6, 2013.

Film

Old Crow Medicine Show performed on the soundtrack for the film Transamerica in 2005, which was nominated for a number of awards—including two Academy Award nominations—winning several around the world. "Critter" Fuqua wrote "Take 'Em Away" while "We're All in This Together" was written by Ketch Secor and Willie Watson.
They appeared in the PBS American Roots Music series; "In the Valley Where Time Stands Still", a film about the history of the Renfro Valley Barn Dance; and "Bluegrass Journey", a portrait of the contemporary bluegrass scene.
They appeared in the musical documentary Big Easy Express, directed by Emmett Malloy, being made of The Railroad Revival Tour, which premiered March 2012 at the South by Southwest Film Conference and Festival (SXSW Film) in Austin, Texas—winning the Headliner Audience Award.

Members

In August 2011, the group announced they were on hiatus, cancelling three shows scheduled for the following month, with "little word from the band on whether there would continue to be a band." Original member Willie Watson left in Fall of 2011, a couple months before Chris "Critter" Fuqua rejoined the group in January 2012. He had left in 2004 "to go to rehab for his drinking, then staying out to attend college." Cory Younts, who left Old Crow a few months into 2012 to perform in Jack White's backup band Los Buzzardos (or The Buzzards) on world tour to support White's album Blunderbuss, returned to the group in 2013.

Current members of the band:

Mike Harris – guitar, mandolin, banjo, dobro, vocals
Morgan Jahnig – upright bass
Jerry Pentecost – drums, marching snare drum, washboard, mandolin, vocals
Ketch Secor – vocals, fiddle, harmonica, banjo, guitar, cigar box guitar
Mason Via – guitar, guitjo, vocals
Cory Younts – mandolin, harmonica, keyboards, vocals

Former members:

Joe Andrews – pedal steel, banjo, mandolin, dobro
Critter Fuqua – slide guitar, banjo, guitar, vocals
Ben Gould – stand-up bass
Kevin Hayes – guitjo, vocals
Matt Kinman – bones, mandolin, vocals
Gill Landry – banjo, resonator guitar, guitar, vocals
Chance McCoy – fiddle, guitar, banjo, mandolin, vocals
Robert Price – multi-instrumentalist
Willie Watson – guitar, banjo, fiddle, harmonica, vocals
Charlie Worsham – guitar, banjo, vocals

Timeline

Discography

Studio albums

AOut of print.
BO.C.M.S. was re-released under the title Old Crow Medicine Show as an import in 2006.

Live albums

EPs
 Vegas (out of print)  **Cassette only
 Troubles Up and Down the Road (2001) (out of print)
 The Webcor Sessions (2002) (out of print)
 NapsterLife 09/29/2004 (2004)
 Down Home Girl (2006) Three-track single featuring previously unreleased song "Fall on my Knees"
 World Cafe Live from iTunes (2006) Broadcast on NPR's World Cafe October 25, 2006
 Caroline (2008) Nettwerk – Three track single featuring previously unreleased song "Back to New Orleans"
 Carry Me Back to Virginia (2013) Three track single featuring a cover of "Dixieland Delight" by Alabama
 Brushy Mountain Conjugal Trailer (2015) Four track single featuring the previously unreleased "Mother Church", a live version of "The Warden", and "I Done Wrong Blues" (previously released as a B-Side on the "Sweet Amarillo" 7").

Contributions
Old Crow Medicine Show performed "Take 'Em Away" (by Fuqua) and "We're All in This Together" (by Secor and Watson) on the soundtrack for the film Transamerica (2005). The film was nominated for a number of awards — including two Oscars — winning several worldwide.
They perform Woody Guthrie's "Deportee (Plane Wreck at Los Gatos)" (Disc 2/Track 15) on Song of America (2007), a 3-CD set tracing the history of the U.S. through new versions of songs by major artists. Produced by Split Rock Records/Thirty One Tigers. Proceeds benefit the Center for American Music, National History Day, and Folk Alliance.
Secor wrote, arranged, and performs "Send No Angels" with Lani Marsh on Our Christmas Present: 2008, a fundraising album for Our Community Place in Harrisonburg, Virginia as a favor to founder/director Ron Copeland, who was owner of Little Grill when/where his and Fuqua's music careers began.
The group recorded "Angel From Montgomery" for Broken Hearts & Dirty Windows: Songs of John Prine (2010), an album celebrating Prine's rich and influential catalog, joining other artists contributing such as Justin Vernon of Bon Iver, My Morning Jacket, Josh Ritter, The Avett Brothers, Conor Oberst & The Mystic Valley Band, Drive-By Truckers, Lambchop, and Justin Townes Earle.
The group appear on "veteran roots/Americana band" Marley's Ghost album Jubilee, released June 2012 on Sage Arts, celebrating their 25th anniversary. Recorded at Nashville's Sound Emporium and produced by Cowboy Jack Clement, the album features other "full-on collaborations between the band and their friends" such as Emmylou Harris, John Prine, Marty Stuart, and Larry Campbell. The album cover a wide variety of classic American songwriters including Kris Kristofferson, Levon Helm, Bobby and Shirley Womack, and John Prine "alongside a half-dozen original compositions."
The group performs "Back Home Again" (track 6) on The Music Is You: A Tribute to John Denver (2013) on ATO Records, an album spotlighting "Denver's folky, sentimental songs done by popular and generally fashionable artists", including My Morning Jacket, Brandi Carlile, Edward Sharpe & the Magnetic Zeros, Dave Matthews, Lucinda Williams, and Josh Ritter.
They have a song about how all creatures talk called "Creature Talks" and "Wonder Why" about some of the world's biggest questions to PBS Kids.
The group collaborated with Marty Stuart on a cover of "I Can See For Miles" for his album Compadres: An Anthology of Duets in 2007.
They contributed a cover of "Deportee (Plane Wreck at Los Gatos)" to the Song of America folk music compilation album.
The group contributed two songs to the 2013 album Woody Guthrie: at 100! Live At The Kennedy Center, including "Howdi Do" and "Union Maid."
For ATO Records' 2013 compilation album Divided & United: The Songs of the Civil War, the group contributed the track "Marching Through Georgia."
In 2013, Old Crow contributed a cover of "Dixieland Delight" for the 40th Anniversary tribute album for country group Alabama.
The group contributed the song "Short Life Of Trouble" to the 2015 Ralph Stanley & Friends album Man of Constant Sorrow.
Keb' Mo' and Old Crow Medicine Show teamed up for the song "Medicine Man" in 2021, which was inspired by the pandemic.
In 2020, Old Crow were featured on the new Sara Evans album Copy That for the cover of "I'm So Lonesome I Could Cry."
The group was featured on the song "Big Backyard" on Molly Tuttle's 2022 album Crooked Tree.

Solo

In 2007, Gill Landry released a solo album titled The Ballad of Lawless Soirez on Nettwerk.
In Spring/Summer of 2010, Landry released his second solo album titled Piety & Desire, which features the Felice Brothers, Brandi Carlile, Jolie Holland, Ketch Secor, and Samantha Parton (of the Be Good Tanyas).
On March 3, 2015 Landry released a self-titled album through ATO Records, his third solo effort.

Music videos

See also 

 Old time fiddle
 Old-time music
 Old Crow

Notes

References

Websites

Interviews

Reviews

Listings

External links 
 
 Paradigm Talent Agency group biography
 Richie Stearns official site

1998 establishments in Virginia
Musical groups established in 1998
Musical groups from Nashville, Tennessee
Grand Ole Opry members
Grammy Award winners
Americana Music Honors & Awards winners
Old-time bands
Country music groups from Virginia
American alternative country groups
American folk musical groups
American bluegrass music groups
American street performers
Phillips Exeter Academy alumni
People from Harrisonburg, Virginia
ATO Records artists
Nettwerk Music Group artists
MapleMusic Recordings artists
Columbia Records artists